Cabezas may refer to:

Surname
Bryan Cabezas, Ecuadorian football player
Carlos Cabezas, Spanish basketball player
Luis Carlos Cabezas, Colombian footballer
Omar Cabezas, Nicaraguan author, revolutionary and politician
Salvador Cabezas, retired Salvadorean footballer
José Luis Cabezas, Argentine news photographer and reporter
Carlos Cabezas (disambiguation)

Places
Bolivia
Cabezas (Cordillera), a town in Santa Cruz Department

Cuba
Cabezas (Unión de Reyes), a village in Matanzas Province

Nicaragua
Puerto Cabezas, a town in the North Caribbean Coast Region

Spain
Cabezas de Alambre, a municipality in the province of Ávila, Castile and León
Cabezas del Pozo, a municipality in the province of Ávila, Castile and León
Cabezas del Villar, a municipality in the province of Ávila, Castile and León
Cabezas Rubias, a municipality in the province of Huelva, Andalusia
Escarabajosa de Cabezas, a municipality in the province of Segovia, Castile and León
Las Cabezas de San Juan, a municipality in the province of Seville, Andalusia
Sauquillo de Cabezas, a municipality in the province of Segovia, Castile and León

United States
Dos Cabezas, Arizona, an unincorporated community of Cochise County, Arizona
Dos Cabezas Mountains, a mountain range of Arizona

See also

Cabeza (disambiguation)